Regular map may refer to:

 a regular map (algebraic geometry), in algebraic geometry, an everywhere-defined, polynomial function of algebraic varieties
 a regular map (graph theory), a symmetric 2-cell embedding of a graph into a closed surface